Star Peak is a  mountain summit located in the Methow Mountains, a sub-range of the North Cascades in Washington state. The peak is the highest point on Sawtooth Ridge. It is protected by the Lake Chelan-Sawtooth Wilderness within the Okanogan–Wenatchee National Forest. The nearest higher peak is Oval Peak,  to the north. Precipitation runoff on the south side of the mountain drains into Lake Chelan via Prince Creek, whereas the north side of the mountain drains into Buttermilk Creek which is a tributary of the Twisp River.

Climate
Lying east of the Cascade crest, the area around Star Peak is a bit drier than areas to the west. Summers can bring warm temperatures and occasional thunderstorms. With its impressive height, Star Peak can have snow on it in late-spring and early-fall, and can be very cold in the winter.

Geology
The North Cascades features some of the most rugged topography in the Cascade Range with craggy peaks, ridges, and deep glacial valleys. Geological events occurring many years ago created the diverse topography and drastic elevation changes over the Cascade Range leading to the various climate differences. These climate differences lead to vegetation variety defining the ecoregions in this area.

The history of the formation of the Cascade Mountains dates back millions of years ago to the late Eocene Epoch. With the North American Plate overriding the Pacific Plate, episodes of volcanic igneous activity persisted.  In addition, small fragments of the oceanic and continental lithosphere called terranes created the North Cascades about 50 million years ago.

During the Pleistocene period dating back over two million years ago, glaciation advancing and retreating repeatedly scoured the landscape leaving deposits of rock debris. The "U"-shaped cross section of the river valleys are a result of recent glaciation. Uplift and faulting in combination with glaciation have been the dominant processes which have created the tall peaks and deep valleys of the North Cascades area.

See also
 Geography of the North Cascades
List of mountain peaks of Washington (state)

References

External links

 Weather forecast: Star Peak

North Cascades
Mountains of Washington (state)
Star Peak
Star Peak
Cascade Range
North American 2000 m summits